Transient modelling is a way of looking at a process with the primary criterion of time, observing the pattern of changes in the subject being studied over time. Its obverse is Steady state, where you might know only the starting and ending figures but do not understand the process by which they were derived.

Transient models will reveal the pattern of a process, which might be sinusoidal or another shape that will help to design a better system to manage that process. Transient models can be done on a spreadsheet with an ability to generate charts, or by any software that can handle data of inputs and outputs and generate some sort of a display. Transient modelling does not need a computer.  It is a methodology that has worked for centuries, by observers noting patterns of change against time, analysing the result and proposing improved design solutions.

A simple example is a garden water tank. This is being topped up by rainfall from the roof, but when the tank is full, the remaining water goes to the drain. When the gardener draws water off, the level falls. If the garden is large and the summer is hot, a steady state will occur in summer where the tank is nearly always empty in summer. If the season is wet, the garden is getting water from the sky, and the tank is not being emptied sufficiently, so in steady state it will be observed to be always full. If the gardener has a way of observing the level of water in the tank, and a record of daily rainfall and temperatures, and is precisely metering the amount of water being drawn off every day, the numbers and the dates can be recorded in spreadsheet at daily intervals. After enough samples are taken, a chart can be developed to model the rise and fall pattern over a year, or over 2 years. With a better understanding of the process, it might emerge that a 200litre water tank would run out 20–25 days a year, but a 400-litre water tank would never run out, and a 300-litre tank would run out only 1-2 day a year and therefore that would be an acceptable risk and it would be the most economical solution.

One of the best examples of transient modelling is transient climate simulation. The analysis of ice cores in glaciers to understand climate change. Ice cores have thousands of layers, each of which represents a winter season of snowfall, and trapped in these are bubbles of air, particle of space dust and pollen which reveal climatic data of the time. By mapping these to a time scale, scientists can analyse the fluctuations over time and make predictions for the future.

Transient modelling is the basis of weather forecasting, of managing ecosystems, rail timetabling, managing the electricity grid, setting the national budget, floating currency, understanding traffic flows on a freeway, solar gains on glass fronted buildings, or even of checking the day-to-day transactions of one's monthly bank statement.

With the transient modelling approach, you understand the whole process better when the inputs and outputs are graphed against time.

References
GroundwaterSoftware.com - Steady State vs. Transient Modeling and FEFLOW

Well Test by Design: Transient Modelling to Predict Behaviour in Extreme Wells

Conceptual modelling